Aclyvolva lanceolata is a species of sea snail, a marine gastropod mollusk in the family Ovulidae, the ovulids, cowry allies or false cowries.

Description
The size of an adult shell varies between 14 mm and 35 mm.

Distribution
This marine species occurs off in the central Indo-Pacific area like for example in India, Japan, New Guinea and New Caledonia.

References

 Cate, C. N. 1973. A systematic revision of the recent Cypraeid family Ovulidae. Veliger 15 (supplement): 1–117.
 Lorenz F. & Fehse D. (2009) The living Ovulidae. A manual of the families of allied cowries: Ovulidae, Pediculariidae and Eocypraeidae. Hackenheim: Conchbooks

External links
 

Ovulidae
Gastropods described in 1848